Martín Nicolás Previtali (born 7 July 1995) is an Argentine professional footballer who plays as a midfielder for Independiente del Valle.

Career
Previtali got his career underway in the ranks of Atlanta of Primera B Metropolitana. He appeared off the bench twice in the 2016 season, prior to making his first start on 22 October 2016 versus Platense. After fifty-eight appearances in four seasons in the third tier, Previtali netted his first goal in a 3–1 victory over Justo José de Urquiza in November 2018. The club won promotion to Primera B Nacional at the end of that season, with Previtali subsequently appearing thirty times in that division; and scoring once, versus Deportivo Morón.

In January 2021, Previtali headed to Ecuadorian Serie A side Independiente del Valle.

Career statistics
.

References

External links

1995 births
Living people
People from Ramos Mejía
Argentine footballers
Argentine expatriate footballers
Association football midfielders
Sportspeople from Buenos Aires Province
Argentine people of Italian descent
Primera Nacional players
Primera B Metropolitana players
Ecuadorian Serie A players
Club Atlético Atlanta footballers
C.S.D. Independiente del Valle footballers
Expatriate footballers in Ecuador
Argentine expatriate sportspeople in Ecuador